Donald D. Clancy (July 24, 1921 – June 12, 2007) was a Republican member of the United States House of Representatives.  He represented the 2nd District of Ohio for eight terms from 1961 until 1977.

Early life and education
Clancy was born in Cincinnati, in Ohio's Hamilton County.
He graduated from Elder High School, attended Xavier University, and completed his studies at Cincinnati Law School in 1948.

Career
In 1948, Clancy was admitted to the bar and commenced the practice of law in Cincinnati.  He served on the city council from 1952 until 1960; from 1958 until 1960 he was the mayor as well as the chairman of the Cincinnati Planning Commission.

Clancy defeated future television talk show personality Jerry Springer in his 1970 re-election campaign.  Clancy received approximately 56% of the vote to Springer's 44%.

Congress
Beginning with the Eighty-seventh Congress, Clancy was elected to congressional office for eight consecutive terms.  When he lost his bid for reelection in 1976, he resumed the practice of law in Cincinnati.

Patty Clancy, his daughter, was an Ohio State Senator, representing Ohio's 8th Senate District.

Death

Clancy died on June 12, 2007 from complications of Parkinson's disease.

References

External links

1921 births
2007 deaths
Mayors of Cincinnati
People from Montgomery, Ohio
Neurological disease deaths in Ohio
Deaths from Parkinson's disease
Xavier University alumni
University of Cincinnati College of Law alumni
Ohio lawyers
20th-century American politicians
Elder High School alumni
20th-century American lawyers
Republican Party members of the United States House of Representatives from Ohio